Leon is a city in Decatur County, Iowa, United States. The population was 1,822 at the time of the 2020 census. It is the county seat of Decatur County.

The city is located near the Little River Lake Recreation Area. Leon is home to a major rodeo that has been Rodeo of the Year in Iowa for many years.

History
Leon was incorporated as a city in 1858. It was a shipping point on the Chicago, Burlington and Quincy Railroad.

Geography
Leon is located on US Route 69 and Iowa Highway 2 approximately 12 miles northeast of Lamoni.

Climate

According to the Köppen Climate Classification system, Leon has a hot-summer humid continental climate, abbreviated "Dfa" on climate maps.

Demographics

2010 census
As of the census of 2010, there were 1,977 people, 826 households, and 482 families living in the city. The racial makeup of the city was 98.1% White, 0.7% African American, 0.3% Native American, 0.6% Asian, 0.2% from other races, and 0.3% from two or more races. Hispanic or Latino of any race were 2.0% of the population.

There were 826 households, of which 28.5% had children under the age of 18 living with them, 42.1% were married couples living together, 12.3% had a female householder with no husband present, 3.9% had a male householder with no wife present, and 41.6% were non-families. 36.9% of all households were made up of individuals, and 18.3% had someone living alone who was 65 years of age or older. The average household size was 2.32 and the average family size was 3.08.

The median age in the city was 40.2 years. 25.3% of residents were under the age of 18; 8.2% were between the ages of 18 and 24; 21.3% were from 25 to 44; 24.9% were from 45 to 64; and 20.4% were 65 years of age or older. The gender makeup of the city was 47.4% male and 52.6% female.

2000 census
As of the census of 2000, there were 1,983 people, 858 households, and 513 families living in the city. The racial makeup of the city was 98.64% White, 0.10% African American, 0.20% Native American, 0.50% Asian, 0.05% from other races, and 0.50% from two or more races. Hispanic or Latino of any race were 1.56% of the population.

There were 858 households, out of which 29.5% had children under the age of 18 living with them, 45.7% were married couples living together, 10.7% had a female householder with no husband present, and 40.1% were non-families. 36.8% of all households were made up of individuals, and 20.6% had someone living alone who was 65 years of age or older. The average household size was 2.23 and the average family size was 2.90.

Age spread: 24.7% under the age of 18, 7.8% from 18 to 24, 24.0% from 25 to 44, 20.5% from 45 to 64, and 23.0% who were 65 years of age or older. The median age was 40 years. For every 100 females, there were 85.0 males. For every 100 females age 18 and over, there were 77.9 males.

The median income for a household in the city was $24,390, and the median income for a family was $33,083. Males had a median income of $24,100 versus $18,849 for females. The per capita income for the city was $13,015. About 12.7% of families and 16.6% of the population were below the poverty line, including 20.9% of those under age 18 and 16.0% of those age 65 or over.

Notable residents
 Steven V. Carter, politician
 Sarah Bond Hanley, politician
 John Clinton Porter, politician

City Council
Bob Frey, Mayor 
Tonya Lindsey
Cody Cooper
Vacant
Jonathan Erb
Daniel Moffett

City Officials
City Administrator 
Kyle Sheetz

Deputy Clerk/City Treasurer 
Lorrie Scrivner

Chief of Police 
Brad Gardner

Fire Chief 
Doug Moffett

Chamber of Commerce
The community of Leon offers small town living in a safe environment with progressive schools and healthcare, active community members, and outdoor recreation with a focus on economic improvement and strong leadership.

Chamber history
On January 15, 1888, a meeting of the business men of Leon was held at the Courthouse at which steps were taken towards organizing a business men's association. At this meeting a committee was appointed for the purpose of drawing up a plan of organization. At a second meeting, the committee recommended that an association be formed at once under the name of the Leon Board of Trade. The shares of stock were fixed at $5 each, and each member of the board was required to take not less than one share of the stock. The constitution and by-laws were at once circulated for signatures, and within 15 minutes thirty of the business men of the town had signified their intention of becoming members of the board. The Board of Trade existed successfully and helpfully for a number of years.
 
The Leon Commercial Club was established on April 26, 1907. The object of the club was to promote the civic and industrial interests of the city and to place Leon on equal footing with similarly sized cities in the State. The officers were:
James F. Harvey - President
A.L. Ackerly - Vice President
William J Springer - Secretary
CW Robinson - Treasurer
 
(Adapted from History of Decatur County Iowa and Its People, The S.J. Clarke Publishing Company, 1915)
 
Today this organization is known as the Leon Chamber of Commerce.  Current membership consists of 58 business members and a number of private, individual members.  The purpose of this organization is to unite into one central organization all of the civic, industrial and commercial activities of this community, To aid, encourage and promote the best interests of the City of Leon and the County of Decatur, To acquire real and personal property, to mortgage, lease and dispose of same, To do any and all things permitted by law for a non-profit corporation, and to exercise any and all powers and privileges permitted by law concerning the same.

In 2013, the Leon Chamber of Commerce and the Leon Community Development Corporation (LCDC) were merged into one organizations. Leon Chamber of Commerce remained and LCDC become a subcommittee of the Leon Chamber of Commerce.

Chamber Officials
President 
Shane Akers

Vice President 
Shannon Erb

Secretary/Treasurer 
Kolton Hewlett

Education
The Central Decatur Community School District operates local area public schools.

See also

 Central Decatur Junior - Senior High School
Decatur County Courthouse (Iowa), listed on the National Register of Historic Places

References

External links

Official Website

Cities in Iowa
Cities in Decatur County, Iowa
County seats in Iowa